Peter Douglas McLean (September 24, 1856 – April 4, 1936) was an educator, physician and political figure in Ontario, Canada. He represented York Centre in the House of Commons of Canada from 1907 to 1908 as a Liberal.

He was born in Oro Township, Canada West and was educated in Barrie and at the University of Toronto. McLean taught school in Craighurst, Simcoe and Edgar. He practised medicine at Woodbridge from 1881. He also served on the municipal council for Woodbridge. McLean was defeated when he ran for reelection to the House of Commons in 1908. He died in Woodbridge at the age of 79.

References

Members of the House of Commons of Canada from Ontario
Liberal Party of Canada MPs
1853 births
1936 deaths